The Simion Bărnuțiu National College is a high school in Șimleu Silvaniei, Romania, that opened on October 1, 1919.

The first principal was Ioan Ossian, a Latin and History teacher. In 1948, after the establishment of Communist Romania, the high school was shut down and was replaced by a professional school, the precursor of today's Ioan Ossian Technological High School. The high school was reopened in 1956 in a different location; the current building dates from 1965.

În 1990, right after the fall of communism, the school was renamed the Simion Bărnuțiu Theoretical High School. It was declared a national college in 2004.

References

Educational institutions established in 1919
Schools in Sălaj County
National Colleges in Romania
Șimleu Silvaniei
1919 establishments in Romania